A lifeline is a fall protection safety device in the form of an open fence composed of wire and stanchions secured around the perimeter of an area to prevent accidental falls.  It is commonly found on sailboats and construction sites, as well as other situations where dangerous falls can occur, such as at scenic overlooks and in caves.

Lifeline wire has traditionally been available in 1/8" and 3/16" wire diameters, with a soft but durable vinyl coating increasing the effective diameters to 7/32" and 5/16" respectively. It
should be inspected on an annual basis for signs of corrosion or breakage of wire strands.

In simplest form, a land-based lifeline consists of a horizontal wire rope cable attached to two or more anchor points on a roof-top, crane runway, bridge or outdoor construction site, or any other elevated work area that poses a fall risk. OSHA defines an anchorage in a fall protection system "a secure point of attachment for lifelines, lanyards, or deceleration devices".

Construction site lifeline systems include dedicated attachment brackets, safety lanyards and harnesses.  Construction lifeline systems may be subdivided into those used to arrest workers in the event of a fall (active systems), or restrain workers from reaching a fall hazard (restraint systems).

References

See also
Safety device
Fall protection

Safety equipment